Secret Diary of a Call Girl is a British drama television series that aired from 27 September 2007 to 22 March 2011 on ITV2, based on the blog and books by the pseudonymous Belle de Jour. It stars Billie Piper as Belle, a high-end London call girl.

The series was written by Lucy Prebble, who is also the author of the plays The Sugar Syndrome and Enron. The series has been compared to Sex and the City by many critics, mainly due to its humorous approach to sex.

Plot
The series, set in London, revolves around the life of Hannah Baxter (Billie Piper), a young woman who lives a secret life as a call girl, under the pseudonym Belle. The series focuses on her professional and private lives and on complications that arise when these collide. She receives help and advice from her best friend Ben (Iddo Goldberg). In the second series premiere, a new call girl is introduced: Bambi (Ashley Madekwe). Hannah becomes close friends with Bambi and often advises her.

Hannah, as the main character, also narrates the series, sometimes through voiceovers but more frequently by breaking the fourth wall. During the first series, the episodes are held together by a light story arc. Series 2 and 3 rely heavily on story arcs, mainly in the form of Hannah's romances, with Alex and Duncan respectively.

Episodes

Cast and characters

Main
 Billie Piper as Hannah "Belle" Baxter: a young, attractive university graduate who, under the pseudonym Belle, has made a name for herself as a successful high-end escort. Hannah is secretive about her job to her family and friends, pretending that she is a night-time legal secretary, although she thoroughly enjoys her work.
 Iddo Goldberg as Ben: Hannah's best friend and former boyfriend from their university days. Ben is the manager of a London bar and is at first unaware of Hannah's real job. Ben is in a relationship with his girlfriend Vanessa who does not care for Hannah. Over the course of the series Hannah and Ben are in a relationship, but ultimately Hannah ends things in the series finale.
 Cherie Lunghi as Stephanie Charlton: Hannah's agent in the first series. Stephanie runs a successful escorting agency called Discreet Elite.  She is a shrewd businesswoman who can sometimes come across as cold-hearted and unfeeling. 
 Ashley Madekwe as Gloria "Bambi" White (series 2–3): a naive young escort who is mentored by Belle and later becomes a close friend. Bambi has had a hard life and mainly wants to escort for the money. She marries Byron, her former client, in the series 3 finale.
 Callum Blue as Alex McLoud (series 2): a doctor whom Belle mistakes for a client. Alex is immediately attracted to Belle but does not realise that she is a prostitute. They are in a relationship, even after he finds out that she is an escort, but eventually break up.
 James D'Arcy as Duncan Atwood (series 3): Hannah's publisher after she has become a best-selling author. Hannah soon develops feelings for Duncan and starts a relationship with him. After it is revealed that he sleeps with escorts frequently, including Bambi, Hannah breaks up with him.
 Lily James as Poppy (series 4): Stephanie's daughter who does not know what her mother does professionally.
 Gemma Chan as Charlotte (series 4): one of the girls working for Discreet Elite. Charlotte is domineering, unfriendly, and used to getting what she wants.
 Paul Nicholls as Det. Sgt. Harry Keegan (series 4): a client of Discreet Elite, who has an exceptional interest in Belle.

Recurring
 Toyah Willcox and Stuart Organ as Gail and Niall Baxter (series 1–2): Hannah's parents who are unaware of their daughter's profession.
 Joanna Bobin as Jackie: Hannah's sister who is unaware of her sister's profession. Jackie is married and has an infant son. When she learns that her husband was unfaithful, she temporarily moves in with Hannah and has an affair with Ben.
 Ace Bhatti as Ashok (series 1–2): One of Belle's favourite regular clients until he chooses to see another escort.

Background and production
The rights to the blog were bought by Silverapples Media (Avril MacRory and Paul Duane), who co-produced the series with Tiger Aspect Productions. The series was initially developed with Channel 4 and when Channel 4 passed on the project, ITV took over. The series aired in a late-night 10pm slot, as part of ITV2's "XXL Thursday" programming block.

The theme song is an excerpt of "You Know I'm No Good" by Amy Winehouse. The song runs whilst the intertitle plays, showing Belle applying make-up and getting dressed, interspersed with shots of urban London.

Both series 1 and 2 consisted of eight episodes: the series was commissioned for a third series, even before the second series was aired. Series 2 became complicated to film due to Piper's pregnancy and body doubles were hired.

The filming of series 3 began at the start of 2009, once Piper had recovered after the birth of her son, Winston, in October 2008. Piper also stated she would be taking on the role of executive producer of the upcoming series as well. Ahead of the series 3 premiere ITV2 aired a one-off interview between Piper and Brooke Magnanti, who had written under the Belle de Jour pseudonym, entitled, Billie and the Real Belle Bare All.

Piper has stated that the fourth series was to be the final.

Broadcast

 

The series was first broadcast on 27 September 2007 on ITV2 in the United Kingdom. It was watched by 1.9 million, a record (which has since been beaten by Bionic Woman) for ITV2.

In Canada, the first series began on Showcase on 22 November 2007. The second series debuted on The Movie Network on 19 January 2009.

In the United States, Showtime aired the first series of eight half-hour episodes beginning in June 2008, with a commitment for an additional 12 episodes.  Robert Greenblatt, Showtime's president of entertainment, initially considered buying format rights and recasting it with American actors, but he ultimately decided that the original was "fantastic"; Greenblatt also noted that "it's very hard to find American actresses who are comfortable doing nudity." The second series aired on 18 January 2009. On 6 November 2009, Showtime announced that the show's third series would return on 25 January 2010 at 10:00pm.  Showtime scheduled the fourth series to premiere 7 April 2011, at 10:30pm.

Home media
The first series was released on 7 January 2008 on Region 2 DVD. Series 2 was released in the United Kingdom on 2 March 2009 and like the first series classified 18. On the same day, a four disc box set edition consisting of both series 1 and 2 was released. On both sets, much of the popular music was replaced due to high licensing costs.

The entire series is also available to download on iTunes and to stream on Netflix UK, Lovefilm UK and Tubi.

In the United States the Region 1 version of series 1 was released on 6 January 2009.  Series 2 was released soon afterwards, in June. Again, much of the music was replaced due to high licensing costs.

The television series is rated R18 in New Zealand as it contains sex scenes and offensive language.

Reception

Critical response

The series was mainly well received by critics, with Tim Goodman of The San Francisco Chronicle saying, "there's surprise at how much you've underestimated its quality." It was graded A− by Entertainment Weekly, which said, "you will find a rather fascinating drama." Entertainment Weekly also commented on Billie Piper's portrayal of Belle, saying, "Piper is extraordinary, intermittently talking right to the camera in a straightforward, conspiratorial manner, the way a prostitute who's really good at her job would talk to a client." It was less well received, however, by The New York Times, which said, "Secret Diary has amusing touches, but not enough to sustain an entire series."

Whilst reviewing Series 3 of Secret Diary of a Call Girl, Gerard O'Donovan of The Telegraph opined that the show focuses too much on Piper's character, saying "All the characters, apart from Belle (Piper), are about as two-dimensional as cardboard cut-outs – and no more engaging."

Criticism

The series was also accused of glamourising and being a misrepresentation of prostitution.

Piper hit back at the claims saying, "We've only been exposed to the drug-fuelled, sex traffic side – but the fact is, there are middle-class, cultured, well-read women who take part in this job."

Ratings
The first series averaged 1,242,125 viewers in the UK. The following weekly viewership statistics are from the Broadcasters' Audience Research Board.

The series premiered in the United States on Showtime to the highest ratings the cable channel had seen in four years for a television premiere. The series debut reached almost one million viewers, its closest rival, Dexter, premiered to 604,000. The showing held on to an impressive 70% of its lead-in audience that tuned in for the fourth-series premiere of Weeds.

International versions
 On 8 April 2012, the Chilean network TVN premiered a remake called Diario secreto de una profesional (The secret diary of a professional). The show stars Fernanda Urrejola as Javiera García, who works as call girl Ángela.
 A Dutch remake, called Dagboek van een Callgirl (Diary of a Call Girl), premiered on 26 March 2015 on Net 5. Sanne Langelaar portrays Anne, who secretly works as call girl Jolie. The story's setting is changed to Amsterdam. The first season adapts several scripts from the first and second series of the UK series. It was not renewed for a second season (which was planned to adapt the third and final series of the British show).

References

External links

  – United Kingdom official website on ITV (videos of episodes cannot be viewed from outside the UK)
 Secret Diary of a Call Girl – Official Website on Showcase (showcase.ca) (Canada) (menu provides link to its blog)
 Secret Diary of a Call Girl – Official website on Showtime (sho.com) (United States) (menu provides links to characters and their fan-edited "Wiki guides").
 Secret Diary of a Call Girl – official website on The Movie Network (Canada)
 
 Belle de Jour: Diary of a London Call Girl – original blog, hosted on Blogspot, upon which the TV series is based

2007 British television series debuts
2011 British television series endings
2000s British drama television series
2010s British drama television series
English-language television shows
Erotic drama television series
ITV television dramas
Prostitution in British television
Showtime (TV network) original programming
Television shows based on books
Television series by Endemol
Television series by Tiger Aspect Productions
Television series by CBS Studios
Television shows set in London
Works based on blogs
Television series created by Lucy Prebble